Roger Öhman (born 5 June 1967) is a Swedish retired ice hockey defenseman. He was selected 39th overall by the Winnipeg Jets in the 1985 NHL Entry Draft. Öhman had five goals and six assists at the 1987 World Junior Ice Hockey Championships. He played 17 years in the European professional leagues, with one year in the AHL.

Career
Öhman started his career with Leksands IF in Sweden. For the 1987-88 season, he played for the Moncton Hawks of the AHL, getting 28 points in 67 games. The following year he would return to Sweden, where he would play until 1995-96. He played mainly for Malmö IF, with two years for AIK. In 1996-97 and 1997–98, Öhman played for the Kassel Huskies In Germany, getting 63 points in 86 games. Ohman spent the next three years with Klagenfurt AC in Austria and HC La Chaux-de-Fonds in Switzerland. From 2000-01 to 2002-03, Öhman returned to Sweden to play for Malmö IF. Öhman retired in 2004.

Öhman coached Djurgårdens IF women's team in the 2017–18 season.

Career statistics

Regular season and playoffs

International

References

External links

1967 births
Living people
AIK IF players
Frölunda HC players
EC KAC players
Kassel Huskies players
HC La Chaux-de-Fonds players
Malmö Redhawks players
Moncton Hawks players
Swedish ice hockey defencemen
Winnipeg Jets (1979–1996) draft picks
Swedish ice hockey coaches
Djurgårdens IF Hockey (women) coaches
Swedish Women's Hockey League coaches